Pataura is a village in Jaunpur, Uttar Pradesh, India. According to a 2011 census, the total population is 2513.

PATAURA  village introduction.

Village -Pataura

Post-Belahari

Block-Muftiganj

Tahasil-Kerakat

District-Jaunpur

State-Uttar Pradesh

Country-India

Pin code-222142

People of Pataura are well educated. Jaunpur district are known as "shiraj- e -hind".

References

Villages in Jaunpur district
Villages in Kerakat